This list of 1. FC Magdeburg players names all football players that have played in at least one competitive match for the first team of 1. FC Magdeburg since its foundation on 22 December 1965. In addition, matches played for the predecessor teams of the club are included in the list. Players that still play for the club have a grey background.

 Player: States the player's name.
 Nation: The player's nationality. Players will be given a nationality based on today's geography, i.e. East German players will be classed as German, while former Soviet Union players will be given their current nationality (e.g. Ukrainian).
 from and to: Date on which the player played its first and last competitive match for the club. This does not account for matches played for other clubs in between.
 League games: Number of league matches played. This includes play-off matches in the 1990-91, 2000–01 and 2014–15 seasons.
 League goals: Number of goals scored in league matches.
 Cup games: Number of cup matches played. This includes all FDGB-Pokal matches, as well as those played in the DFB-Pokal and the Saxony-Anhalt Cup.
 Cup goals: Number of goals scored in cup matches.
 European games: Number of matches played in the European Cup, European Cup Winners' Cup and UEFA Cup. Magdeburg have played in three European Cup seasons, seven Cup Winner's Cup seasons and six UEFA Cup seasons. Altogether the club has played 72 European matches.
 European goals: Number of goals scored in European matches.

Literature 
Blau-Weißes Lexikon – 40 Jahre 1.FC Magdeburg. MDprint, Magdeburg 2005, .

External links 
 1. FC Magdeburg players at fussballdaten.de
 1. FC Magdeburg players at weltfussball.de
 1. FC Magdeburg players at rsssf.com

Magdeburg players
Players
 
Association football player non-biographical articles